BBC Radio 1's Live Lounge 2012 is a compilation album consisting of live tracks played on Fearne Cotton's BBC Radio 1 show, both cover versions and original songs. The album was released on 29 October 2012, and is the eighth in the series of Live Lounge albums.

Track listing

Charts

References 

2012 compilation albums
2012 live albums
Live Lounge
Covers albums
Rhino Entertainment compilation albums
Sony Music compilation albums
Universal Music Group compilation albums
Universal Music TV albums

simple:Radio 1's Live Lounge